The following Forbes list of Vietnamese billionaires is based on an annual assessment of wealth and assets compiled and published by Forbes magazine in 2021 and 2022.

Vietnamese billionaires list

See also
 The World's Billionaires
 List of countries by the number of billionaires

References

External links
 The World's Billionaires: Vietnam (real time)

Lists of people by wealth
Net worth
 
net worth